Daniel Capecci (born December 12, 1983 in Vestal, New York) is an American soccer player, who currently plays for SFC United Premier.

Career
He joined the Wilmington Hammerheads in 2004 after a season with USL Premier Development League team Syracuse Salty Dogs. He started playing soccer with Ancona Calcio. The midfielder played the 2007 season for American USL Second Division side Crystal Palace Baltimore and joined in Winter 2008 to Sweden. In 2008 started in Sweden his European career and played for Oskarshamns AIK, Valsta Syrianska IK and IK Frej.

References

1983 births
Living people
American soccer players
American expatriate soccer players
A.C. Ancona players
Association football midfielders
USL Second Division players
Syracuse Salty Dogs players
Wilmington Hammerheads FC players
American expatriate sportspeople in Sweden
Crystal Palace Baltimore players
Expatriate footballers in Sweden
People from Vestal, New York
Soccer players from New York (state)
American expatriate sportspeople in Italy
Oskarshamns AIK players